385 Bourke Street (also known as the State Bank Centre) is a high-rise office building located in Melbourne, Australia. It is the former head office of the State Bank of Victoria and Commonwealth Bank of Australia. It is located at 385 Bourke Street on the corner of Bourke and Elizabeth Streets.

The lower levels of the building are the Galleria shopping centre. Major tenants in the building are EnergyAustralia, and Industry Superannuation fund UniSuper.

See also
List of tallest buildings in Melbourne

References

External links

Skyscrapers in Melbourne
Office buildings in Melbourne
Skyscraper office buildings in Australia
Shopping centres in Victoria (Australia)
Office buildings completed in 1983
International Style (architecture)
1983 establishments in Australia
Bourke Street
Elizabeth Street, Melbourne
Buildings and structures in Melbourne City Centre